is a series of Japanese otome game visual novels created and developed by the software game company Honeybee. Starry Sky was separated into four games, the first was released in 2008, with three love interests in each, for a total of twelve possible love interests across all four games. Starry Sky was well received in Japan, and was released as Drama CDs, countless manga adaptations and a 26-episode anime adaptation. In addition, sequels of the four original games were created for both Windows and PlayStation Portable in 2008-2009, and 2011 respectively.

Gameplay
The player takes control of Tsukiko Yahisa, the heroine of the Starry☆Sky games, although her name can be changed by the player. The games are primarily told in visual novel format, where the player's decisions inadvertently affect the relationships she has with potential love interests in the game.

Plot
Tsukiko Yahisa is the first female student to enroll at Seigetsu Academy, a former all-boys school specializing in astronomy. She is closely watched over by her childhood friends, Kanata Nanami and Suzuya Tohzuki, who often protect her from the male student body. Throughout the games, she befriends other young men whose personalities are based on the Western zodiac constellations.

In the first game, Starry☆Sky~in Spring~, shortly after Tsukiko transfers to Seigetsu Academy, a half-French boy named Yoh Tomoe follows in persuit her. This action stirs up emotions from Kanata and Suzuya, both of whom had long loved Tsukiko.

In the second game, Starry☆Sky~in Summer~, Tsukiko has joined the academy's archery club. As she practices for the summer competition, she simultaneously solves the problems between her teammates (Homare Kanakubo, Ryunosuke Miyaji, and Azusa Kinose).

In the third game, Starry☆Sky~in Autumn~, Tsukiko becomes involved with three teachers at her school (Iku Mizushima, Naoshi Haruki, and Kotarou Hoshizuki).

The last game, Starry☆Sky~in Winter~, details Tsukiko's involvement with the student council, which includes Tsubasa Amaha, Kazuki Shiranui, and Hayato Aozora.

Characters
 
Tsukiko is the heroine of all of the Starry☆Sky games, although her name can be changed by the player. She is the first female student to attend Seigetsu Academy. She is a second year.

Spring
 
Yoh represents Capricorn. His French name is Henri Samuel Jean Aimée. Likewise, he is half-French and was often teased for that as a kid. He met Tsukiko when he was young, and because she was the only person who didn't make fun of him for being half-French, he fell in love with her and asked his father to let him transfer to Seigetsu Academy in order to pursue her. Initially disdainful to everyone except Tsukiko, eventually, he learns the importance of having friends. His father hopes to work in America to develop a special astronomy project. He is a second year.
 
Kanata represents Pisces. Brash and impulsive, he has been friends with Tsukiko since childhood and has developed feelings for her. He does not get along very well with Yoh. Kanata suffers from a terminal illness that leaves him in a lethargic state, which is why he often skips classes and faints without reason. However, he refuses to seek medical help and often gets into school fights that worsen his health to protect Tsukiko. He is a second year.
 
Suzuya represents Cancer. Calm and friendly, he was friends with Tsukiko and Kanata since childhood and often watches out for them like an older brother. He is very good at cooking and often uses the school's kitchen to prepare food for his friends. Suzuya is also in love with Tsukiko, but because he knows that Kanata also loves her, he held back. Beneath his warm exterior, Suzuya has a dark side and worries about Tsukiko constantly. He is a second year.

Summer
 
Azusa represents Sagittarius. Although he is a newcomer to the archery club, he has met Tsukiko before and inspired her to become better at it. He is cold, serious, plain-flat, expressionless, emotionless, cool-headed, quiet, calm, reserved, introvert, stoic, even not talk too much to say (as a kuudere at same time also dandere), and confident of himself/braverly; while he declares himself as a natural genius, creative, shrewd and cunning, he is in fact insecure/uncourageous of his abilities as he can't put his heart into anything. Azusa often flirts with Tsukiko and his actions annoy Ryunosuke a lot. He is a first year.
It's turns out that actually he is revealed as Tsubasa's distant relative whose just same ages only with him, but have different personality with him; a scenery that contrasts with Tsubasa whose is hot-blooded and cheerful, laid-back, gentle, warm, supple, also he has a bubbly and playful personality. Despite having a feminine, girly, girlish, androgynous, and girls-like appearance, due of he is depicted as a beautiful/pretty young guy, but Azusa is truly still stay just a bona fide boy whose doing "trap" only. However, if when between of other all boy characters, just Azusa own only, whose apparently himself is known/famous as an emo boy too, even he's much a more emo rather than/unlike Tsubasa.
 
Homare represents Taurus. He is the captain of the archery club. He is openly friendly and often settles arguments between Ryunosuke and Azusa, but is prone to feel pressured for the success of the archery club. He is a third year. His best friends are Shiranui Kazuki and Shirogane Oushirou from the same year.
 
Ryunosuke represents Scorpio. He is the sub-captain of the archery club. He appears to be serious and calm, but hides a penchant for sweets. Ryunosuke has kept an eye out for Tsukiko ever since he first saw her. He is a second year.

Autumn
 
Naoshi represents Leo. He is Tsukiko's homeroom teacher and the advisor for the archery club. He is energetic and enjoys the "youth" part of high school since he spent high school mostly studying, and because of that, a lot of students can't take him seriously and often play pranks on him. Naoshi's best friend, Hiroki, got him to enjoy high school, but Hiroki was hit by a car saving the girl he liked. Because of that, he was afraid to fall in love until he met Tsukiko.
 
Iku represents Gemini. He is currently a student teacher and is friends with the school nurse, Kotarou, since they were children. Iku and his twin sister Yui were both born with poor health, and Yui died while they were in high school. He was formerly the lead singer of a band the heroine liked, but destroyed his voice while overworking himself due to the pain of his sister's death. His band members turned out to be using him for money and promptly dismissed him when he could no longer sing. Iku lost trust in everyone until a girl, Tsukiko, helped him gain it back.
 
Kotarou represents Libra. He is the school nurse who had ambitions to become a doctor. Iku's sister, Yui, had feelings for him, but after her death Kotarou blamed himself for not being able to save her. His father is the chairman of the academy, but after his father's retirement, the position was given to Kotarou's sister, Koharu. However, he ended up obtaining the position due to Koharu's wish to work overseas.

Winter
 
Kazuki represents Aries. He is the president of the student council. He is gifted with the power of foresight, although this ability does not allow him to see everything. He blames himself for the death of his parents because of his lack of understanding his power. Because of this, he hates his power. As a child, he was often involved in fights to prove his own strength, but one day he had met Tsukiko, who told him that only people who think they are weak try and show their strength through brute force. He had become friends with her, and Kanata and Suzuya as well. He is a third year (apparently he repeated a year, together with Shirogane)
 
Tsubasa represents Aquarius. He is the treasurer of the student council. He often lights up the mood in the student council. However, he is emotionally unstable. At a very young age he was abandoned by his parents who got divorced. He was taken in by his grandparents on his mother's side. When Tsubasa was young, he spent a lot of time with his grandfather and they often made inventions together. Even now, Tsubasa still likes to invent things. His grandfather's dying wish made Tsubasa promise to take care of his grandmother. His grandmother sent Tsubasa away to school, and ever since Tsubasa likes to be alone. He thinks that being alone is better than being with people because he is afraid of losing things that are important to him. He is a first year.
 
Hayato represents Virgo. He is the vice president of the student council. He comes from a well-known family of pianists, but lacks self-confidence and feels pressured to be up to par with his family's talent. In the end he decided to leave his house and stays in the school dorm. He is a second year.

Special character
 
Represents Ophiuchus, the 13th constellation. Special "13th Character" that was introduced in the 13th secret date CD. Not much information is given. His Greek name translates to “serpent-bearer” and he is often seen holding an albino snake in many official illustrations. In the fourth game Starry Sky in Winter it's mentioned that he has greater, stranger power than Kazuki Shiranui.

Minor characters
 
 
Oushirou is an acquaintance of Kazuki's and Homare's, he carries a camera everywhere due to being a journalist for the school paper. He is in third year.
 
Izumi is a first year student in the Mythology department who appears in the After Spring game. He has a serious and straightforward personality despite his devil-may-care appearance. He tends to act on his thoughts, does not think very deeply, and does not lie either. Despite coming from a yakuza background, he is a pacifist at heart and is weak at fighting.
 
Oshinari is a student teacher who appears in the After Spring game. When he is free, he helps out at the dormitories.
 
The name of this character is changeable. Haruna appears in the After Spring, Summer and Autumn games. She is a boyish character who the protagonist relies on for advice.

Family
 
Yoh's father who is French. Often teases Yoh for fun. He has a cheerful personality and tends to dote on his wife to the extent that he sometimes forgets about Yoh's existence.
 
Yoh's mother. She actually knows the protagonist's mother as they were classmates. She and her husband are still passionately in love.
 
Kanata's mother. Despite her coarse language, she is good at looking after others. After her husband's death, she raised Kanata by herself. Although she hits Kanata quite often, she pampers the protagonist and Suzuya, and thinks of them like her own children.
 
Suzuya's mother. As the result of being the only housewife within the three families in After Spring, she is the one who looked after the children the longest. Her husband is a salary-man and is not shown in the game.

Development
All character designs, covers, and background art were digitally painted by Kazuaki.

In 2011, JAST USA announced it was considering licensing the Starry Sky series for an English release.

Media

Game
Starry☆Sky was separated into four games, each one taking place in a different season with three possible love interests, for the PC. The first game, Starry☆Sky~in Spring~, was released on March 27, 2008. The opening theme song was titled Starry Sky and was performed by Hikaru Midorikawa, the voice of Yoh Tomoe. Following its release, the second installment, Starry☆Sky~in Summer~ was released on June 26, 2008. The opening theme song was titled Shoot High and was performed by Hiroshi Kamiya, the voice of Ryunosuke Miyaji. The third game, Starry☆Sky~in Autumn~, was released on September 25, 2008, and its theme song was Lies, Truth, and Our Destiny performed by Daisuke Kishio, the voice of Naoshi Haruki. The last game, Starry☆Sky~in Winter~, was released on December 25, 2008, and the opening theme song was Grayed Out performed by Yuichi Nakamura, the voice of Kazuki Shiranui. Starting in 2009, all four games were ported onto the PlayStation Portable.

The original games were followed by a spin-off, which takes place between the epilogue and the original time of the game. Starry☆Sky~After Spring~ was the first of the spin-off games to release onto the PC.

CDs
The limited edition of all the games were bundled with a CD with the full version of the opening theme and a separate drama CD featuring the male characters in the game. A full-length drama CD for the spring characters was released on August 28, 2005. In addition, a soundtrack for the game's music was released on September 25, 2002.

Throughout 2005, twelve date CDs were released monthly, starting with Yoh Tomoe (the Capricorn) on January 30, 2005, to Azusa Kinose (the Sagittarius) on December 25, 2005. The date CDs feature the voice actors for each of the twelve possible love interests in the game and simulate a date and a romance between the listener and the character. Each CD came with a special coupon. If the coupons from all twelve CDs were submitted to Honeybee at the end of the year, one would receive a secret date CD featuring a 13th character, Shiki Kagurazaka (voiced by Mamoru Miyano), who represents the Ophiuchus, the 13th constellation.

Manga
Short manga stories about the characters of each game have been collected into anthologies by DNA Media Comics. Starry☆Sky~in Spring~ Comic Anthology was released on October 24, 2002, and features all the characters from the spring game. Similarly, Starry☆Sky~in Summer~ Comic Anthology was released on December 25, 2002.

Anime
An anime adaptation was distributed through Animate.tv's website and Sun TV. It was written by Makoto Nakamura and directed by Kiyoko Sayama.

There are 26 episodes lasting 11 minutes each. First airing of the episodes was on Animate.tv in late of December 2008. In February 2011, Sun TV started also simulcasting this series, airing two parts episodes of this series as a whole episode (meaning 13 episodes by 22 minutes each). They are done in an episodic format, with each episode (or two parts of the episode) focusing on one character or subset of characters from the storyline.

Reception
The game was well-received upon its release in Japan. The Spring game was featured in magazines such as Dengeki Girls'Style.

References

External links
 Honeybee's official website
 Frontier Works' official website for the anime
 
 

2005 video games
2006 video games
2007 video games
2008 video games
2009 video games
2010 video games
2008 Japanese television series endings
Anime television series based on video games
Japan-exclusive video games
Nintendo 3DS games
Otome games
PlayStation Portable games
PlayStation Vita games
Studio Deen
Video games developed in Japan
Windows games
HuneX games